Mecklenburg County Courthouse is a historic courthouse building located at Charlotte, Mecklenburg County, North Carolina.  It was designed by architect Louis H. Asbury and built between 1925 and 1928. It is four-story, rectangular, Neoclassical building sheathed in limestone.  The structure is a three-part composition with a decastyle Corinthian order portico on the front facade.  The rear elevation has a tetrastyle portico sheltering the three-center bays and Corinthian pilasters.

It was listed on the National Register of Historic Places in 1979.

References

County courthouses in North Carolina
Courthouses on the National Register of Historic Places in North Carolina
Neoclassical architecture in North Carolina
Government buildings completed in 1928
Buildings and structures in Charlotte, North Carolina
National Register of Historic Places in Mecklenburg County, North Carolina
1928 establishments in North Carolina